Argentan is a commune and the seat of two cantons and of an arrondissement in the Orne department in northwestern France.

Argentan is located  NE of Rennes,  ENE of the Mont Saint-Michel,  SE of Cherbourg,  SSE of Caen,  SW of Rouen and  N of Le Mans. Argentan station has rail connections to Caen, Le Mans, Paris and Granville.

History

Argentan is situated near the river Orne. Although the region was heavily populated during the Gallo Roman period the town is not mentioned until 1025–1026. The town grew in importance during the Middle Ages.

Throughout the Middle Ages, Argentan alternated between prosperity and destruction, as English forces occupied the city several times. The Plantagenets had considered this town as one of the most important of Normandy.

During the reign of Louis XIV, Colbert set Alençon against Argentan in an economic competition on lace making. Thus, the point d'Argentan ("Argentan stitch") and the point d'Alençon ("Alençon stitch") were created. Argentan became a very important town for traditional industry. It also gained in religious importance with the building of a Benedictine Abbey and two churches, Saint-Martin and Saint-Germain. Several mansions (hôtels particuliers) were also built.

During World War I, the French 104th Infantry Regiment/14th Infantry Brigade was stationed at Argentan. It participated in the battle of Verdun in 1916.

During World War II, the city was almost totally destroyed. On 5 June 1944, on the eve of the Allied D-Day landing on the beaches of Normandy, the city suffered an important air raid in which the train station was destroyed. The city suffered further damage when it was bombed on 6 and 7 June by B-17 and B-24 bombers of the U.S. Eighth Air Force. The greatest part of the city was, however, left in ruins two and a half months later, at the end of August, during the battle of the Argentan-Falaise Pocket. The U.S. Third Army, under the command of general George S. Patton liberated Argentan after eight days of violent combat against the German 9th Panzer Division and the 2nd SS Panzer Division Das Reich. The U.S. 80th Infantry Division liberated the city in the morning of 20 August.

Population

Main sights

 Donjon of Argentan
 Tour Marguerite, a medieval tower
 Ducal Castle (14th century), now a court house. It houses the St. Nicholas Chapels (late 11th century), built by Pierre II of Alençon
 Saint Martin church (15th–16th centuries)
 Saint Germain church (16th–18th centuries)
 Saint Roch Chapel
 Museum of the Argentan lace

Gallery

Notable people
Giles d'Argentan (c. 1280 – 24 June 1314), Norman knight who was killed at the Battle of Bannockburn
François-Eudes de Mézeray (1610–1683), historian
Fernand Léger (1881–1955), painter
André Mare (1885–1935), painter
Michel Onfray (born 1959), writer and philosopher

Twin towns – sister cities

Argentan is twinned with:
 Abingdon-on-Thames, England, United Kingdom
 Baja, Hungary
 Rotenburg an der Fulda, Germany

See also
Communes of the Orne department
Château de la Motte, Joué du Plain

References

External links

Official website
Tourism site

Communes of Orne
Subprefectures in France